Brachymonas petroleovorans is a Gram-negative, aerobic bacterium from the genus Brachymonas and family Comamonadaceae, which was isolated from a wastewater plant of a petroleum refinery. B. petroleovorans has the ability to degrade cyclohexane and aromatic compounds such as toluene and m-cresol.

References

Comamonadaceae